Call of the Wild is a 1935 American adventure western film an adaptation of Jack London's 1903 novel The Call of the Wild. The film is directed by William A. Wellman, and stars Clark Gable, Loretta Young and Jack Oakie. The screenplay is by Gene Fowler and Leonard Praskins. This is the last film to be released under the 20th Century Pictures banner before being merged with the Fox Film Corporation to create 20th Century-Fox.

Plot
In Skagway in 1900, Jack Thornton announces to a crowded bar that he is going home after striking it rich in the gold fields. However, he loses most of his money gambling first. Then he runs into an old pal, "Shorty" Hoolihan, just released from jail after serving a sentence for reading other people's mail. Shorty tells Jack that the contents of one letter he read is worth a million dollars. It contained a map to a rich gold strike; prospector Martin Blake died before he could stake his claim to it, but the letter was mailed to his son John. Shorty had to eat the map when he was apprehended, but reconstructed it as best he could from memory.

Jack's luck changes when he pays $250 for Buck, a savage St. Bernard dog, to keep him from being shot by an arrogant Englishman named Smith. Jack and Shorty head off for the Yukon with the map, Buck and other dogs. Along the way, they rescue Claire Blake from wolves. Her husband is Martin Blake's son and had the original map; he left to look for food and did not return. She refuses to leave without determining John's fate, but Jack drags her away. Sharing the hardships of the trail on their way to Dawson, her initial loathing of Jack gradually melts away.

Once they reach Dawson, Jack proposes she join forces with them, as she knows what parts of Shorty's map are wrong. She agrees. However, they still need a stake. Smith bets a thousand dollars against Buck that the dog cannot pull a heavily loaded sled weighing thousand pounds a hundred yards. Buck manages the feat, enabling them to buy what they need.

After the trio set out in search of Martin Blake's find, a barely alive John Blake is found and brought in. He talks Smith into backing him and joining him on the trail to the site, but does not trust the Englishman and his two henchmen.

The three reach their destination and find it to be all they had hoped. Shorty leaves to file a claim. Jack and Claire wait and eventually acknowledge their love for each other. Buck, in the meantime, feels a strong urge to join a pack of wolves; he frequently leaves to spend time with a female wolf.

When Blake and Smith reach the site, Smith has Blake strangled, then holds Jack and Claire at gunpoint. The intruders take the gold they have already gathered and destroy anything that would enable the couple to leave. The villains then leave in their canoe, but it overturns and they drown, weighed down by the stolen gold, within sight of Jack and Claire.

Buck finds John Blake, still alive, though in bad shape. They nurse him back to health. Jack wants to keep Claire anyway, but she will not go along. Jack then recommends that John leave to get proper medical attention before the weather makes it impossible. John and Claire leave.

Jack acknowledges Buck's desire to answer the "call of the wild", and releases him into the wilderness. Buck is shown with his new family of half-dog, half-wolf pups, playing in the woods.

Jack is soon joined by Shorty, who arrives with news of their claim and a new cook.

Cast 
 Clark Gable as Jack Thornton
 Loretta Young as Claire Blake
 Jack Oakie as "Shorty" Hoolihan
 Reginald Owen as Mr. Smith
 Frank Conroy as John Blake
 Katherine DeMille as Marie
 Sidney Toler as Joe Groggins
 James Burke as Ole
 Charles Stevens as Francois
 Lalo Encinas as Kali
 Thomas E. Jackson as "Tex" Rickard
 Russ Powell as Bartender
 Herman Bing as Sam
 George McQuarrie as Mounted Policeman
 Buck as himself

Production
During the filming of Call of the Wild, Clark Gable impregnated Loretta Young, which resulted in Young's hushed-up pregnancy and the birth of their daughter Judy Lewis (1935–2011). In 2015, Linda Lewis, Young's daughter-in-law, stated publicly that Young had confided to her before her death that Gable had date raped her, and that though the two had flirted on-set, there had been no affair. This was the last film released under the Twentieth Century Pictures' banner before it merged with Fox Film Corporation to create 20th Century-Fox Film Corporation.

Filming locations

References

External links

 
 
 
 

1935 films
1935 adventure films
American adventure films
1935 Western (genre) films
American Western (genre) films
American black-and-white films
1930s English-language films
Films based on The Call of the Wild
Films directed by William A. Wellman
Films scored by Alfred Newman
Films set in 1900
Films set in Alaska
Films set in the Arctic
Films produced by Darryl F. Zanuck
Twentieth Century Pictures films
1930s American films